The 1991 Sam Houston State Bearkats football team represented Sam Houston State University as a member of the Southland Conference during the 1991 NCAA Division I-AA football season. Led by tenth-year head coach Ron Randleman, the Bearkats compiled an overall record of 8–3–1 with a mark of 5–2 in conference play, and finished tied for first in the Southland.

Schedule

References

Sam Houston State
Sam Houston Bearkats football seasons
Southland Conference football champion seasons
Sam Houston State Bearkats football